The University of Alabama in Huntsville (UAH) is a public research university in Huntsville, Alabama. The university is accredited by the Southern Association of Colleges and Schools and comprises nine colleges: arts, humanities & social sciences; business; education; engineering; honors; nursing; professional & continuing studies; science; and graduate. The university's enrollment is approximately 10,000. It is part of the University of Alabama System and is classified among "R1: Doctoral Universities: Very High Research Activity".

History

The genesis for a publicly funded institution of higher education in Huntsville was years in the making. Beginning in January 1950 as an extension of the University of Alabama and known as the University of Alabama Huntsville Center, classes were first taught at West Huntsville High School.

However, the university's direction changed in 1961, when Wernher von Braun, a German rocket scientist brought to the United States under Operation Paperclip after working for the Nazi regime, helped create a research institute to provide advanced engineering and science curricula to NASA scientists and engineers. This institute was built right off of US 72 which was renamed to University Drive quickly after. Throughout the years, the campus expanded south along Sparkman Drive to reach Interstate 565.

UAH's first undergraduate degrees were awarded in May 1968 as part of the spring commencement ceremony at The University of Alabama, Tuscaloosa, (although a "cap and gown" ceremony was held in Huntsville). One year later, the University of Alabama System Board of Trustees voted to make UAH an independent and autonomous campus. Benjamin Graves, a 1942 graduate of the University of Mississippi and president of Millsaps College in Jackson, Mississippi, was tapped as UAH's first president in 1970. He returned to faculty status in 1979 and retired in 1989. The first degree awarded for work completed entirely on the UAH campus was awarded to Julian Palmore in 1964. Mr. Palmore was at the time a United States Navy ensign assigned to NASA's Research Projects Division. The first official on-campus graduation ceremony at UAH was in June 1970. The first woman to earn a Ph.D. from UAH was Virginia Kobler in 1979, in Industrial Engineering.

UAH's second president, John Wright, former Vice Chancellor of the West Virginia University, served from 1979 to 1988. UAH's third president was Louis Padulo, former Stanford professor and dean of engineering of Boston University. Huntsville leader Joseph Moquin took over the UAH presidency on an interim basis in 1990. Frank Franz, who was then provost at West Virginia University, was chosen as UAH's fourth president. His wife, Judy Franz, accompanied him and was granted full professorship in the physics faculty. Her renown in the scientific community was reaffirmed when she was named executive officer of the American Physical Society in 1994. At the beginning of the 2006–2007 academic year, Franz announced his plan to step down as president after that year. On July 1, 2007, David B. Williams, formerly a professor of materials science and engineering and the vice provost for research at Lehigh University, began serving as UAH's fifth president. He left in 2011 to join Ohio State University as dean of engineering.

The university briefly gained national attention in February 2010 when a professor killed three people and wounded three others during a faculty meeting.

Robert Altenkirch was hired as the university's sixth president in September 2011. Altenkirch served as president of the New Jersey Institute of Technology for nine years before joining UAH. In 2019, Darren Dawson, former dean of the College of Engineering at Kansas State University, became UAH's seventh president. Dawson announced his retirement in November 2021, and Charles L. Karr, former dean of the University of Alabama's College of Engineering, was named interim president. In September 2022, Karr was named president.

Academics

UAH offers 89 degree-granting programs, including 44 bachelor's degree programs, 30 master's degree programs, and 15 PhD programs through its nine colleges: arts, humanities & social sciences; business; education; engineering; honors; nursing; professional & continuing studies; science; and graduate. Nursing is UAH's largest single major, although Engineering is the largest college. There is also an Honors College that offers an enriched academic and community experience for undergraduates in all disciplines.

Not surprisingly given Huntsville's technology-based economy, UAH is known for engineering and science programs, including astrophysics, atmospheric science,  aerospace engineering, cybersecurity, and digital animation. The first "commercial" non-rocketry programs (Consort and Joust) in the U.S. were managed by UAH scientists, the first "high-temperature" superconductor was discovered at UAH, and the first U.S. experiment flown aboard the Soviet Mir Space Station was from UAH. UAH is a Space Grant university and has a history of cooperation with NASA's Marshall Space Flight Center and the U.S. Army Aviation and Missile Command at Redstone Arsenal. In conjunction with helping NASA reach its goals, UAH makes NASA's research and technology available to all of Alabama's colleges and universities. The National Space Science and Technology Center is one of 17 high-tech research centers on UAH 505-acre campus.

The UAH Propulsion Research Center (PRC) promotes interdisciplinary research opportunities for graduate and undergraduate students. The PRC was founded by Dr. Clark W. Hawk in 1991 and has since provided support for NASA, the U.S. Department of Defense (DoD), and the U.S. Department of Energy. Research topics include air-breathing and electric propulsion; solid, liquid & hybrid propellant combustion; magnetoinertial fusion; high-temperature materials; and space and terrestrial power systems.

Research in nanotechnology and microfabrication is conducted by the Nano and Micro Devices Center.

Atmospheric Sciences and related research areas are headquartered in the NSSTC and SWIRLL buildings.

At least nine departments or programs also hold accreditation from professional associations, including the Accreditation Board for Engineering and Technology, the American Assembly of Collegiate Schools of Business, the American Chemical Society, the Commission on Collegiate Nursing Education, the Computing Sciences Accreditation Board, The National Association of Schools of Art and Design, and the National Association of Schools of Music.

Rankings

UAH ranked 263rd among "National Universities" and No. 128 for "Top Public Schools" in the 2020 U.S. News & World Report "Best Colleges" report.

Athletics

UAH sponsors six men's and seven women's varsity athletics programs. In 2016, UAH added men's and women's lacrosse to its varsity athletic programs. UAH is a member of the National Collegiate Athletics Association (NCAA), competing in Division II in 15 sports. UAH is a member of the Gulf South Conference in all sports except men's lacrosse, which plays in the men's lacrosse (Peach Belt Conference).

Both men's and women's tennis programs were discontinued in June 2020 due to financial difficulties from COVID-19. After a privately funded 2020-2021 season, the men's hockey program was also discontinued in May 2021.

Student life and activities

Student government
The UAH Student Government Association is the primary recipient of student-activity funding from UAH's Office of Student Life; the Space Hardware Club, a registered student organization in the College of Engineering is the secondary recipient. The SGA holds an advisory role with campus administrators on activities involving students. The SGA hosts a number of events including Week of Welcome, a bi-annual event welcoming students back to campus that begins the weekend they arrive on campus and runs through the first week of each semester.

Residence halls
UAH has seven residence halls: Bevill Center, Central Campus, Charger Village Addition, Charger Village Original, Frank Franz, North Campus, and Southeast. Central Campus, Frank Franz, and North are reserved for first-time freshmen. Frank Franz Hall is reserved for First time Honors College students. Charger Village Addition and Charger Village Original are reserved for sophomores, whereas upperclass students have the option of living at the other residence halls.

Campus housing originated with the construction of Southeast Campus Housing. These suites were originally built under the auspices of the late Dr. Benjamin Graves, the first President of UAH, with the assistance of the late Alabama Senator John Sparkman.

Greek life
UAH is home to the following fraternities and sororities. Most Greek organizations rent a fraternity or sorority house from the university. Construction of the original houses was made possible by donations from Mark and Linda Smith and Jim and Susie Hudson.

Fraternities
 Alpha Phi Alpha
 Alpha Tau Omega
 Delta Chi
 Kappa Alpha Psi
 Phi Beta Sigma
 Pi Kappa Alpha
 Sigma Nu
 Phi Kappa Psi

Sororities
 Alpha Kappa Alpha
 Delta Sigma Theta
 Delta Zeta
 Kappa Delta
 Alpha Omicron Pi
 Zeta Phi Beta

ACE
The Association for Campus Entertainment (ACE) is a student run and operated organization that hosts weekly events throughout the academic year as well as standing programs such as Friday Night Flicks, Sunday Cinema, Late-Night Breakfast, and ACE Wednesday. Notable guests include Daniel Tosh and Recycled Percussion.

Clubs and organizations
UAH has more than 150 student-run organizations on campus. Team UAH has won several concrete canoe construction competitions with five national titles in 1993, 1994, 1996, 1998, and 2001. The National Concrete Canoe Competition is sponsored annually by the American Society of Civil Engineers. The UAH American Society of Mechanical Engineers student chapter also competes in the annual NASA Human Exploration Rover Challenge. It holds two championship titles. The UAH Space Hardware Club conceptualizes, designs, builds, tests, and flies hardware for high-altitude balloons, satellites (ChargerSat Program), the CanSat competition, and high-powered rocketry.

Student Success Center
The Student Success Center (SSC) offers tutoring for nearly all freshman- and sophomore-level courses offered at UAH. Additional tutoring is available for math courses online and in person.

The SSC recruits university students for its PASS (Peer Assisted Study Sessions) program, in which students sit in on courses that they have already succeeded in, and offers class-specific study sessions outside of class, usually 3 hours per week. Historically difficult freshman courses are targeted for PASS, including calculus, chemistry, and economics.

Facilities

The College of Science houses the Alabama High Field Nuclear Magnetic Resonance (NMR) Center, which is dedicated to providing modern high field NMR capabilities to academic and corporate researchers in the state of Alabama and surrounding areas.

UAH's Earth System Science Center is dedicated to the interdisciplinary study of the Earth as an integrated system with an emphasis on space- and ground-based remote sensing data.

UAH's Department of Biological Sciences partners with the Dauphin Island Sea Lab to offer research opportunities to UAH students through the Marine Environmental Sciences Consortium.

UAH's Psychology Department has eight research labs: Lifelong Learning, Memory and Cognition, Personality Testing and Assessment, Privacy in Cyberspace, Psychobiology, Teamwork and Social Cognition, Employee Engagement and Productivity, and Leadership and Organizational Behavior.

UAH's Propulsion Research Center connects the academic research community and the propulsion community through interdisciplinary collaboration in the following areas: aerospace materials and structures, computational modeling, energy and power systems, fusion propulsion and power, plasmas and combustion, propellants and energetics, and propulsion systems integration.

UAH's College of Engineering is home to the following labs:
 Advanced Digital Hardware Design Lab 
 Communication Systems Laboratory
 Controls and Dynamic Systems Lab
 Cyber Chargers Security Lab 
 ECE Systems Design Lab 
 Electronics Laboratory 
 Integrated Biometrics Lab 
 LaCASA - Computer Architecture Research Lab 
 MEMS Fabrication Lab 
 MHealth - Mobile Health and Wellness Monitoring Lab 
 Multimedia Development Lab 
 Multicore Reconfigurable and GPU 
 Enabled Parallel Computing Lab 
 RF Circuits and Devices Lab 
 Software Safety Engineering and Security Lab 
 Supervisory Control and Data Acquisition (SCADA) Security Lab 
 Linux Labs I and II 
 Photonics Lab 
 Optoelectronics 
 Optical Hybrid Computing 
 Nano-Microfabrication Laboratory 
 Laser Science and Engineering Lab 
 Transistor and MEMS Undergraduate Microfabrication Lab 
 Ubiquitous Computing Lab

UAH's Kinesiology Research Lab, located in the College of Education, has an underwater treadmill that enables students to conduct aquatic exercise research on adults with type 2 diabetes and lower-limb amputation.

SWIRLL (Severe Weather Institute – Radar and Lightning Laboratories) is a core research facility dedicated to research on severe and hazardous weather, radar meteorology, lightning meteorology, lightning physics, and air quality. It comprises a research operations center with multiple workstations, a high bay used for the maintenance and fabrication of comprehensive mobile platforms and other instruments, a sounding preparation lab, and five roof platforms to support instrument testing and data collection.

UAH's Learning and Technology Resource Center, located in the College of Nursing, offers high-tech, hands-on clinical experience thanks to its high-fidelity simulators, telehealth robots, and laboratory spaces.

UAH's Early Learning Center, an outreach and service unit of the College of Education, provides inclusive early childhood education for children in developmentally appropriate classrooms.

Notable alumni and faculty

Alumni

Faculty

References

External links

 
 Alabama–Huntsville Athletics website

 
Educational institutions established in 1950
Landmarks in Alabama
Universities and colleges accredited by the Southern Association of Colleges and Schools
Buildings and structures in Huntsville, Alabama
Tourist attractions in Huntsville, Alabama
1950 establishments in Alabama
University of Alabama in Huntsville
University of Alabama in Huntsville
Universities and colleges in Huntsville, Alabama